Morir de pie (English: Die Standing) is a 1957 Mexican film. It was written by Janet and Luis Alcoriza.

External links
 

1957 films
Mexican action drama films
1950s Spanish-language films
1950s Mexican films